Buddhism is New Zealand's third-largest religion after Christianity and Hinduism standing at 1.5% of the population of New Zealand. Buddhism originates in Asia and was introduced to New Zealand by immigrants from East Asia.

History
The first Buddhists in New Zealand were Chinese diggers in the Otago goldfields in the 1860s. Their numbers were small, and the 1926 census, the first to include Buddhism, recorded only 169. In the 1970s travel to Asian countries and visits by Buddhist teachers sparked an interest in the religious traditions of Asia, and significant numbers of New Zealanders adopted Buddhist practices and teachings.

Since the 1980s Asian migrants and refugees have established their varied forms of Buddhism in New Zealand. In the 2010s more than 50 groups, mostly in the Auckland region, offered different Buddhist traditions at temples, centres, monasteries and retreat centres. Many migrant communities brought priests or religious specialists from their own countries and their temples and centres have acted as focal points for a particular ethnic community, offering language and religious instruction.
National and international groups.

In 2008 the Sixth Global Conference on Buddhism brought leading teachers and scholars to Auckland under the auspices of the New Zealand Buddhist Foundation. The New Zealand Buddhist Council was established in 2007 and was composed of 15 Buddhist organisations. As of 2020 there are 32 member organizations. They engage with local and national government over issues of concern to Buddhist communities, support their members administratively and promote dialogue and understanding between the rich diversity of traditions in the country.

Demographics
According to the 2006 Census, Buddhism constituted 1.4% of the population of New Zealand. It slightly increased to 1.5% in the 2013 census. Most of the Buddhists in New Zealand are migrants from Asia with significant New Zealanders converted to Buddhism ranging from 15,000-20,000. According to the 2013 census, there are about 58,440 Buddhists in New Zealand. The converts to Buddhism is estimated to constitute between 25%–35% of the total Buddhist population in New Zealand. The 2018 census counted 52,779 Buddhists in New Zealand.

Contemporary Society
According to a Survey done by Victoria University of Wellington in 2019, it was found that New Zealanders believe that Buddhists are the most trusted religious group in New Zealand. About 35 per cent of New Zealanders have complete or substantial trust in Buddhists.

Buddhist temples

There are many Buddhist temples and centres in New Zealand for New Zealand Buddhists to practice their religion. The largest being Fo Guang Shan Temple in Auckland. The International Buddhist Centre in Christchurch's Riccarton Road opened in 2007; it was designed by Warren and Mahoney. Closed after the 2011 Christchurch earthquake, the temple reopened in August 2016. Both Bodhinyanarama Monastery and Vimutti Buddhist Monastery belong to Forest Tradition of Ajahn Chah.

See also
Thai Forest Tradition
Fo Guang Shan
Buddhism in Australia
Buddhism in Oceania
Buddhism in Southeast Asia
Index of Buddhism-related articles

References

External links

 
New Z
Religion in New Zealand
Religion in Oceania
Buddhism in Oceania